The following ships of the Indian Navy have been named INS Trishul:

  was a Type 12,  commissioned in 1960, which served in the Portuguese-Indian War and the Indo-Pakistani War of 1971

Indian Navy ship names